Melanie Oudin was the defending champion, having won the event in 2013, but lost in the second round to Jennifer Brady.
 
Madison Brengle won the title, defeating Michelle Larcher de Brito 6–1, 6–4 in the final.

Seeds

Main draw

Finals

Top half

Bottom half

References 
 Main draw

Red Rock Pro Open - Singles
Singles